Josep Maria Terricabras i Nogueras (Calella, 1946) is a Catalan philosopher, professor and politician from Spain. He was elected Member of the European Parliament (MEP) for Republican Left of Catalonia in the 2014 European Parliament election.

References

External links
Josep Maria Terricabras

1946 births
Living people
Philosophers from Catalonia
People from Calella
MEPs for Spain 2014–2019
Republican Left of Catalonia MEPs